Ethan Stuart William Galbraith (born 11 May 2001) is a Northern Irish professional footballer who plays as a midfielder for  club Salford City, on loan from Manchester United, and the Northern Ireland national team.

Galbraith left Linfield to join the Manchester United academy in 2017. He made his first-team debut for United in a UEFA Europa League match against Astana in November 2019. He spent the 2021–22 season on loan at Doncaster Rovers. Galbraith represented Northern Ireland at under-17, under-19, under-21 levels. He made his senior international debut at the age of 18, against Luxembourg, in September 2019.

Club career
Galbraith played for Carnmoney Colts, Ballyclare Comrades, Glentoran, Crusaders and Linfield in his youth. In 2017, he left Linfield and joined the youth academy of English club Manchester United on a one-year scholarship, before signing a two-year professional contract with the club in May 2018. On 28 November 2019, he made his senior debut in a UEFA Europa League match against Kazakh team Astana, coming on as an 89th-minute substitute for Tahith Chong. In October 2020, Galbraith signed a new three-year contract with United, with the option of an extra year.

Doncaster Rovers and Salford City loans
He joined League One club Doncaster Rovers on a season-long loan in August 2021. On 26 October, Galbraith scored his first goal for Doncaster, scoring the equaliser in a 1–1 draw with Cambridge United with a strike from 30 yards. Manager Richie Wellens praised his performances, predicting that he would go on to have a long and successful career. Galbraith described his spell at Doncaster as a "great experience" despite the team being relegated.

On 1 September 2022, Galbraith joined League Two side Salford City on a season-long loan, managed by former United youth coach Neil Wood. He scored his first goal for the club on 8 October in a 1–0 win against Northampton Town, Salford's first win against their opponents.

International career
Galbraith made five appearances for Northern Ireland at under-17 level and three appearances at under-19 level. He has made 19 appearances and scored one goal at under-21 level. Galbraith made his senior international debut at the age of 18 on 5 September 2019, in a friendly match against Luxembourg which finished as a 1–0 win.

Playing style
Northern Ireland manager Ian Baraclough described Galbraith as the country's version of Spanish international midfielders Xavi and Andrés Iniesta. Neil Wood has described him at technically gifted, and as a player who "can pick a pass and has all the different varieties of delivery".

Career statistics

Club

International

References

External links
 
 
 
 

2001 births
Living people
Association footballers from Belfast
Association footballers from Northern Ireland
Northern Ireland youth international footballers
Northern Ireland under-21 international footballers
Northern Ireland international footballers
Association football midfielders
Manchester United F.C. players
Ballyclare Comrades F.C. players
Glentoran F.C. players
Crusaders F.C. players
Linfield F.C. players
Doncaster Rovers F.C. players
Salford City F.C. players